Ancistrus fulvus is a species of catfish in the family Loricariidae. It is native to South America, where it occurs in the Acará River basin in the lower Amazon River drainage in Brazil. The species reaches 8.8 cm (3.5 inches) SL.

References 

fulvus
Fish described in 1929
Fauna of Brazil